Salem Township is one of the fourteen townships of Shelby County, Ohio, United States.  The 2000 census found 2,231 people in the township, 1,910 of whom lived in the unincorporated portions of the township.

Geography
Located in the eastern part of the county, it borders the following townships:
Jackson Township - north
Bloomfield Township, Logan County - northeast
Pleasant Township, Logan County - east
Miami Township, Logan County - southeast
Perry Township - south
Clinton Township - southwest
Franklin Township - northwest

The village of Port Jefferson is located in southern Salem Township, and the unincorporated community of Maplewood lies in the northern part of the township.

Name and history
Salem Township was established in 1826. It is one of fourteen Salem Townships statewide.

Government
The township is governed by a three-member board of trustees, who are elected in November of odd-numbered years to a four-year term beginning on the following January 1. Two are elected in the year after the presidential election and one is elected in the year before it. There is also an elected township fiscal officer, who serves a four-year term beginning on April 1 of the year after the election, which is held in November of the year before the presidential election. Vacancies in the fiscal officership or on the board of trustees are filled by the remaining trustees.

References

External links
County website

Townships in Shelby County, Ohio
Townships in Ohio